Ivar Hansen (1 November 1938 – 11 March 2003) was a Danish politician from the Liberal party Venstre.

He was elected to the Folketing in 1973. In 1978-1979, he was Minister of Public Works in the Anker Jørgensen cabinet. In 1998, he became speaker of the Folketing defeating his Social Democrat rival, Birte Weiss, after a drawing of lots.

He served until his sudden death in the Copenhagen apartment of his mistress Mariann Fischer Boel, who was at the time Minister for Foods and Agriculture. She publicly announced the death after she had talked to his wife. She continued her work and went on to become the European Commissioner for Agriculture.

He was chairman of the JydskeVestkysten newspaper from 1991to 1998.

References 

1938 births
2003 deaths
Speakers of the Folketing
Transport ministers of Denmark